The Women's skeet competition at the 2015 European Games in Baku, Azerbaijan was held on 16 June at the Baku Shooting Centre.

Schedule
All times are local (UTC+5).

Records

Results

Qualification

Semifinal

Finals

Bronze medal match

Gold medal match

References

External links

Women's skeet
Euro